Olivebridge is a hamlet in the town of Olive, Ulster County, New York, United States, within Catskill Park and the Catskill Mountains.

The community's name is sometimes written Olive Bridge, but the United States Board on Geographic Names gives the name as Olivebridge.

The Ashokan-Turnwood Covered Bridge was listed on the National Register of Historic Places in 2000.

The U.S. post office ZIP code for Olivebridge is 12461 and includes the hamlets of Krumville and Samsonville, which no longer have their own post offices.

References

Hamlets in New York (state)
Catskills
Hamlets in Ulster County, New York